Banka is a city and a municipality serving as district headquarters. It is one of the most important business hubs in Bihar. It is the 10th largest city within Bihar. The city is historically very important because of Mandar Hill where Samudra Manthan has been occurred by Hindu rituals. The District was formed on 21st February 1991.

Demographics
 India census, Banka had a population of 35,416, with 54% males and 46% females. The average literacy rate was 55%, lower than the national average of 59.5%, with 61% of the males and 39% of females literate; 16% of the population was under 6 years of age.

References

 
Cities and towns in Anga Desh
Cities and towns in Banka district